The 2009 FA Women's Cup Final was the 39th final of the FA Women's Cup, England's primary cup competition for women's football teams. It was the 16th final to be held under the direct control of the Football Association (FA). The final was contested between Arsenal and Sunderland at Pride Park Stadium in Derby on 4 May 2009. Arsenal won the game 2–1 to secure their fourth successive FA Cup triumph and their tenth in total. The match was attended by a crowd of 23,291.

Match

Summary
Arsenal, managed by Vic Akers, reached their fourth FA Women's Cup final in succession after a 3–1 victory against Everton in the semi-finals, while Premier League Northern Division side Sunderland, managed by Mick Mulhern, reached their first ever final in the competition after beating Chelsea 3–0 at the Stadium of Light, becoming the first team from outside the top flight to do so since Fulham in 2002.

Arsenal, who came into the game as favourites, dominated the vast majority of the match, with Gemma Davison and Kim Little creating several chances in the opening minutes. Sunderland created their first half chance as Sophie Williams chased a long ball down the left and crossed, but Niamh Fahey's challenge was enough to prevent Jordan Nobbs getting in a clean shot on goal. Arsenal hit back with Little striking over from distance and Davison drawing a save from Sunderland goalkeeper Helen Alderson after cutting in from the left. An angled shot from Suzanne Grant slid underneath Alderson, but Lucy Bronze managed to prevent Rachel Yankey from scoring with a last-ditch clearance. Arsenal took the lead just after the half hour, when Alderson failed to hold Davison's shot and Katie Chapman followed up to score from the rebound. The Gunners had a chance to double their lead two minutes ahead of the break, when Little slotted a good ball through to Grant, but her shot went wide of the far post.

Arsenal had most of the possession in the second half, but their second goal came in injury time, when Chapman chipped the ball into the path of Little, who got round Alderson before tucking the ball into the empty net. Kelly McDougall pulled one back for Sunderland in the seventh minute of stoppage time, whose length was dictated by Sophie Williams having to receive more than five minutes of treatment after suffering a seizure.

Details

References

2009
2008–09 in English women's football
FA Women's Cup Final, 2009
FA Women's Cup Final